James Byrnes Heidel (born December 1, 1943) is a former American football player who played for the St. Louis Cardinals and New Orleans Saints of the National Football League (NFL). He played college football at the University of Mississippi.

References

1943 births
Living people
American football defensive backs
Ole Miss Rebels football players
St. Louis Cardinals (football) players
New Orleans Saints players
Players of American football from Mississippi
People from Yazoo City, Mississippi